Jaminpur is a village under Binodpur Union of Shibganj Upazila, Chapai Nawabganj District in western Bangladesh.

Jaminpur has one primary school and a dakhil madrasa. There is no high school in the village.

See also
 List of villages in Bangladesh

References

Populated places in Rajshahi Division
Villages in Chapai Nawabganj District
Villages in Rajshahi Division